Percival Spencer may refer to:

Percival G. Spencer (1864-1913), British balloonist  
Percival H. Spencer (1897–1995), American inventor (Spencer repeating rifle), aviation pioneer and businessman
Percival Spencer (athlete) (born 1975), Jamaican sprinter

See also
Percy Spencer (1894–1970), American engineer and inventor